Cuncush (Ancash Quechua for Puya raimondii) is a mountain in the southern part of the Cordillera Blanca in the Andes of Peru, about  high. It is situated in the Ancash Region, Recuay Province, Catac District. Cuncush lies southwest of Mururaju and northwest of Pukarahu.

References 

Mountains of Peru
Mountains of Ancash Region